Rohati is a village and jamoat in Tajikistan. It is located in Rudaki District, one of the Districts of Republican Subordination. The jamoat had a total population of 32,152 in 2015.

Notes

References

Populated places in Districts of Republican Subordination
Jamoats of Tajikistan